Tang Bi-a (born 3 May 1960) is a Taiwanese legislator. She speaks Japanese fluently. Tang is a supporter of the Taiwanese localization movement.

Legislative career 
During her legislative career, Tang expressed her distaste in China by encouraging the boycott of Chinese product as a result of China's blockage of Taiwan's bid to join the World Health Assembly.

Studying abroad, Tang has more experience on foreign affairs. She joined ROC President Chen Shui-bian's entourage for a Central America summit in 2007. Having been elected three times as legislator, Tang is one of the most experienced female member of the Democratic Progressive Party.

In November 2010, Tang was elected city councilor of Tainan, which is a special municipality after a merger between the provincial Tainan City and Tainan County.

References

External links 
 
 Official profile, Legislative Yuan 

1960 births
Living people
Democratic Progressive Party Members of the Legislative Yuan
Women local politicians in Taiwan
Tainan Members of the Legislative Yuan
Members of the 4th Legislative Yuan
Members of the 5th Legislative Yuan
Tainan City Councilors
21st-century Taiwanese women politicians
20th-century Taiwanese women politicians